Ismail bin Abdul Muttalib (Jawi: إسماعيل بن عبدالمطلب; born 1 December 1954) is a Malaysian politician who has served as the Member of Parliament (MP) for Maran since March 2004. He served as the Deputy Minister of Housing and Local Government for the second term in the Barisan Nasional (BN) administration under former Prime Minister Ismail Sabri Yaakob and former Minister Reezal Merican Naina Merican from August 2021 to the collapse of the BN administration in November 2022 and the first term in the Perikatan Nasional (PN) administration under former Prime Minister Muhyiddin Yassin and former Minister Zuraida Kamaruddin from March 2020 to the collapse of the PN administration in August 2021.  He is a member of the Malaysian Islamic Party (PAS), a component party of the PN coalition and was a member of the United Malays National Organisation (UMNO), a component party of the BN coalition. 

Ismail was elected to Parliament in the 2004 general election and was re-elected thrice in 2008 general election, 2013 general election and 2018 general election.  After the 2013 Malaysian general election, he was appointed to serve as the Deputy Minister of Human Resources in the BN administration under former Prime Minister Najib Razak and former Minister Richard Riot Jaem from May 2013 to May 2018 for almost 5 years. 

On 3 November 2022, Ismail Muttalib was re-elected to the seat in the 15th general election under PN ticket.

Election results

Honours
  :
  Companion of the Order of the Defender of the Realm (JMN) (2013)
  :
  Knight Companion of the Order of the Crown of Pahang (DIMP) - Dato' (2005)
  Knight Companion of the Order of Sultan Ahmad Shah of Pahang (DSAP) - Dato' (2013)
  Grand Knight of the Order of Sultan Ahmad Shah of Pahang (SSAP) - Dato' Sri (2015)

See also
 Maran (federal constituency)

References

Living people
1954 births
People from Pahang
Malaysian people of Malay descent
Malaysian Muslims
Former United Malays National Organisation politicians
Malaysian Islamic Party politicians
Members of the Dewan Rakyat
21st-century Malaysian politicians
Companions of the Order of the Defender of the Realm